Verrucous (appearing like a wart or "verruca") can refer to:
 Verrucous carcinoma
 Verrucous lupus erythematosus
 Proliferative verrucous leukoplakia
 Verrucous perforating collagenoma
 Verrucous cyst
 Verrucous vascular malformation
 Unilateral palmoplantar verrucous nevus